Kipp "Kippie" Keller (born July 14, 2000) is an American professional soccer player who plays as a defender for Austin FC of Major League Soccer.

Career

Youth and college
Keller played high school soccer at The Principia in St. Louis, Missouri, where he was named First-team All-State selection, helping to lead them to a state championship his freshman year. Keller also played club soccer with the Saint Louis FC academy, where he helped the U-19 side advance to the USSDA playoffs in 2018. He signed an academy contract with Saint Louis FC in 2019, making a single appearance for the club in the US Open Cup on May 29, 2019, against Forward Madison.

In 2019, Keller attended Saint Louis University to play college soccer. He went on to make 49 appearances for the Billikens, scoring five goals and tallying two assists. He also earned honors such as second-team All-Conference and A-10 All-Rookie team in 2019, second-team All-Conference in 2020, and second-team All-American nod in 2021, as well as Atlantic-10 Conference Defensive Player of the Year. He and the 2021 team advanced to the quarterfinals of the NCAA College Cup.

Keller was part of the USL League Two roster for St. Louis Scott Gallagher during their 2021 season, but didn't appear for the club.

Professional
In January 2022, it was announced that Keller had signed a Generation Adidas contract with Major League Soccer, and would leave college a year early to enter the 2022 MLS SuperDraft. On January 11, 2022, he was selected 5th overall in the SuperDraft by Austin FC.

He made his professional debut on February 26, 2022, starting against FC Cincinnati in a 5–0 win.

Career statistics

References

External links
Saint Louis Billikens profile
Austin FC profile

2000 births
Living people
American soccer players
Association football defenders
Austin FC draft picks
Austin FC players
Saint Louis Billikens men's soccer players
Saint Louis FC players
Soccer players from Missouri
Major League Soccer players